Kalateh-ye Dahan Do Tagi (also Romanized as Kalāteh-ye Dahan Do Tagī; also known as Kalāteh-ye Ḩamzeh) is a village in Doreh Rural District, in the Central District of Sarbisheh County, South Khorasan Province, Iran. At the 2006 census, its population was 45, in 11 families.

References 

Populated places in Sarbisheh County